Reyabad (also Romanized as Reyābād and Riābād) is a village in Kalat-e Hay-ye Sharqi Rural District, in the Central District of Meyami County, Semnan Province, Iran. At the 2006 census, its population was 408, in 139 families.

References 

Populated places in Meyami County